Günther Wessely (born 5 August 1959) is a retired Austrian football player and a football manager who last managed ASK Kottingbrunn.

Playing career

Wessely played as a defender for SK Rapid Wien.

Coaching career

Wessely managed in the Austrian lower divisions between 1995 and 2011.

External links
 

1959 births
Living people
Austrian footballers
Austrian football managers
SKN St. Pölten managers
Austrian Football Bundesliga players
SK Rapid Wien players
Association football defenders